The Rushaway Stakes is an American ungraded Thoroughbred horse race held annually at Turfway Park in Florence, Kentucky. It was first run on March 22, 1986, the last year the racetrack was called Latonia. The race is open to three-year-old horses and run over a distance of one and one sixteenth miles (8.5 furlongs). Originally raced on natural dirt, and for the first two years at one mile, since 2021 it has been contested on Tapeta synthetic dirt.

The race is named in honor of the racehorse Rushaway who, on Friday afternoon, May 22, 1936, won the Illinois Derby at Aurora Downs in Aurora, Illinois. That night, the three-year-old gelding was shipped three hundred miles south via express train to the Latonia Race Track in Latonia, Kentucky where on Saturday he won the Latonia Derby. Rushaway's feat of endurance is unmatched and still talked about more than eighty years later. His accomplishment in the Latonia Derby was made even more remarkable because Rushaway was carrying top weight in the eight-horse field by three pounds yet won by 6 lengths and did it in a new race record time for the mile-and-a-quarter distance.

Records
Speed record: 
  miles - 1:40.60 - Anet  (1997) NTR

Most wins by a jockey:
 5 - Pat Day (1989, 1991, 1994, 2002, 2003)

Most wins by a trainer:
 2 - William R. Helmbrecht (1987, 1989)
 2 - Neil J. Howard (1993, 1994)
 2 - Bob Baffert (1997, 1998)
 2 - Todd Pletcher (2006, 2010)
 2 - Darrin Miller (2007, 2009)

Most wins by an owner:
 2 - William S. Farish III (1993, 1994)
 2 - Team Valor (1995, 2013)
 2 - Silverton Hill LLC (2007, 2009)

Winners

References

External links
 Turfway Park official site

Ungraded stakes races in the United States
Triple Crown Prep Races
Turfway Park horse races
1986 establishments in Kentucky
Recurring sporting events established in 1986